Union Wharf is an historic wharf at 295-353 Commercial Street in the North End of Boston, Massachusetts.  The wharf began as a more modest wooden structure in the late 18th century, and was developed with a complex of granite buildings roughly between 1830 and 1850.  It was one of the major centers of trade on the Port of Boston in the mid-19th century, and served as a passenger terminal later in the 19th century.

The wharf and buildings were listed on the National Register of Historic Places in 1980.

See also
Port of Boston
 National Register of Historic Places listings in northern Boston, Massachusetts

References

Boston Harbor
Industrial buildings and structures on the National Register of Historic Places in Massachusetts
Wharves in Boston
North End, Boston
National Register of Historic Places in Boston
Wharves on the National Register of Historic Places
Transportation buildings and structures on the National Register of Historic Places in Massachusetts